Changuinola "Capitan Manuel Niño" International Airport  is an airport serving Changuinola, the capital of the Changuinola District in the Bocas del Toro Province in Panama. The name is in honor of the first Panamanian pilot.

Facilities

The Airport terminal is a two-story building, similar to the Enrique Malek International Airport terminal building. The ground floor has a waiting area, bathrooms, cafeteria, and space for three regional carriers offices. The second floor has administrative offices and other government agency offices. Next to the terminal, there is an air traffic control tower, Bocas Fruit Co., and ATOPAN (aerial fumigation) hangars.

Airlines and destinations

See also
Transport in Panama
List of airports in Panama

References

External links
OpenStreetMap - Changuinola

OurAirports - Cap Manuel Niño International Airport

Airports in Panama
Buildings and structures in Bocas del Toro Province